The women's 200 metre backstroke competition at the 2022 Mediterranean Games was held on 2 July 2022 at the Aquatic Center of the Olympic Complex in Bir El Djir.

Records
Prior to this competition, the existing world and Mediterranean Games records were as follows:

Results

Heats
The heats were started at 11:29.

Final 
The final was held at 19:37.

References

Women's 200 metre backstroke
2022 in women's swimming